Hough may refer to:

 Hamstringing, or severing the Achilles tendon of an animal
 the leg or shin of an animal (in the Scots language), from which the dish potted hough is made
 Hough (surname)

Communities

United Kingdom
 Hough, Alderley Edge, a location in Cheshire
 Hough, Argyll and Bute, a location on the island of Tiree, Scotland
 Hough, Cheshire, a village near Crewe in north-west England
 Hough End, an area of Chorlton-cum-Hardy, Manchester, England
location of Hough End Hall
 Hough Green, a residential area of the town of Widnes, England
Hough Green railway station
 Hough-on-the-Hill, a village in Lincolnshire, north-east England
 Thornton Hough, a village in Merseyside, England

United States
alphabetically by state
 Hough Springs, California,  an unincorporated community in Lake County
 Hough, Cleveland, a neighborhood in Ohio
location of the Hough Riots
 Hough, Oklahoma, an unincorporated community in Texas County

Geographical features
 Hough Glacier, in Antarctica
 Hough Peak, in Essex County, New York, U.S.
 Houghs Creek (Delaware River tributary), in Bucks County, Pennsylvania, U.S.
 Houghs Neck, a peninsula in Norfolk County, Massachusetts, U.S.

Schools
 Hough Graduate School of Business, part of the University of Florida
 Thistley Hough Academy, in Staffordshire, England

Other
 Hough Priory, in Hough-on-the-Hill, Lincolnshire, England
 Hough transform, a technique in digital image processing
 Hough Windmill, in Swannington, Leicestershire, England